Kwaguʼł are a Kwakwakaʼwakw tribe  of the Indigenous peoples of the Pacific Northwest Coast from central British Columbia, on northern Vancouver Island.  Their main community is called Tsax̱is or Fort Rupert.  The ancestral language is Kwakʼwala, a language that is a part of the Wakashan language group.  In their language, Kwaguʼł translates to Smoke-Around-the-World referring to the smoke that exited from the many bighouses in their villages.

The band government of the Kwaguʼł is the Kwakiutl First Nation.  The anglicization "Kwakiutl" and other forms of this group's name was for a long time used to describe all the Kwakwakaʼwakw peoples, but properly refers only to this group.  The term "Kwakiutl" is also used by the Laich-kwil-tach or Lekwiltok (Euclataws or Yucultas, historically) who migrated from the vicinity of what would become Fort Rupert to what is now the City of Campbell River and adjoining islands at the start of the 19th century; they identify as the Southern Kwakiutl.

Notable members
Artist Mungo Martin and his descendants, many of whom are also prominent artists.
Tony Hunt, chief of the Kwaguʼł and a carver/sculptor

References 
 Johan Adrian Jacobsen: Alaskan Voyage, 1881-1883: An Expedition to the Northwest Coast of America, University of Chicago Press; Auflage: Reprint (April 1983),

External links 
 U'mista Cultural Society

Kwakwaka'wakw